Herbert Tsangtse Kwouk,   (18 July 1930 – 24 May 2016) was a British actor, known for his role as Cato in the Pink Panther films. He made appearances in many television programmes, including a portrayal of Imperial Japanese Army Major Yamauchi in the British drama series Tenko and as Entwistle in Last of the Summer Wine.

Early life
Kwouk was born on 18 July 1930 in Warrington, Lancashire, to Chinese parents; his parents were on a business trip touring Europe. He was brought up in Shanghai; his father was a textile tycoon descended from a Tang dynasty general. Between the ages of 12 and 16, he attended the Shanghai Jesuit Mission School, which he described as "the Far East equivalent" of Eton College. He left China in 1947 when his parents returned to Britain, and was sent to the United States to complete his education. In 1953, he graduated from Bowdoin College in Brunswick, Maine. The Kwouk family fortune was lost in the Chinese communist revolution in the 1940s. In 1954, he returned to Britain, where a girlfriend "nagged [him] into acting".

Career
Kwouk made his film debut in Windom's Way (1957). One of his earliest film roles was in The Inn of the Sixth Happiness (1958) in the role of the leader of a prison revolt who later aids the main character Gladys Aylward (Ingrid Bergman) in heroically leading orphans to safety. He was best known for playing Cato Fong, Inspector Clouseau's manservant, in the Pink Panther film series. The character was first introduced in A Shot in the Dark (1964), the second film in the series, and was a role that Kwouk would reprise on another six occasions until the 2006 series reboot. The running gag was that Cato was ordered to attack Clouseau when he least expected it to keep him alert, usually resulting in a ruined romantic encounter or Clouseau's flat being completely destroyed. Amid the chaos, the phone would ring and Cato would calmly answer it before dutifully handing the phone to his employer and being thumped by Clouseau.

He was a stalwart of several 1960s ITC television series, such as Danger Man, The Saint and Man of the World, when an oriental character was required. Kwouk featured as one of the leads in the short-lived series The Sentimental Agent (1963) and had minor roles in three James Bond films. In Goldfinger (1964), he played Mr. Ling, a Chinese expert in nuclear fission; in the non-Eon spoof Casino Royale (1967), he played a general and, in You Only Live Twice (also 1967), Kwouk played the part of a Japanese operative of Blofeld, credited as Spectre3.  He appeared with Laurence Olivier and Anthony Quinn in The Shoes of the Fisherman

A reference to Kwouk's appearances in several films with Peter Sellers is found in the opening scene of The Fiendish Plot of Dr. Fu Manchu (1980) where Sellers says to him "your face is familiar." His next major role was as the honourable but misguided Major Yamauchi in the World War II television drama Tenko (1981–84). Kwouk featured in many British television productions that called for an oriental actor. As a result, he became a familiar face in the United Kingdom and appeared as himself in the Harry Hill Show as well as several of Hill's live tours. Burt also had a cameo in Super Gran in 1985.

In 2000, he appeared in an episode of the syndicated western TV series Queen of Swords as Master Kiyomasa, an aged Japanese warrior-priest. Sung-Hi Lee played his female pupil, Kami. He provided voice-overs on the spoof Japanese betting show Banzai (2001–04) and subsequently appeared in adverts for the betting company, Bet365. From 2002 to the series's end in 2010, he had a regular role as one of the three main characters in the long-running series Last of the Summer Wine, as 'Electrical' Entwistle. His later work also included voice acting for radio drama, video games, and television commercials.

Personal life
Kwouk married Caroline Tebbs in Wandsworth, London, in the summer of 1961. Their son Christopher was born in 1974. Kwouk was appointed an Officer of the Order of the British Empire (OBE) in the 2011 New Year Honours for services to drama. In later years, he lived in Hampstead, London.

Death
Kwouk died on 24 May 2016 at the age of 85, from cancer at the Marie Curie Hospice in Hampstead.

Selected filmography

Film

Television

 Hancock's Half Hour: "How to Win Money and Influence People" (1957) as 1st Japanese (credited as Burd Kwok)
 Danger Man (1961) as Chen Tung / Tai
 Man of the World (1962) as Liu
 The Sentimental Agent (1963) as Chin
 The Avengers (1961-1965) as Tusamo / Mason / King Tenuphon
 The Saint (1965-1968) as Mr. Ching / Col. Wing / Tawau
 The Champions: "The Beginning" (1967) as Chinese Major
 Shirley's World: "A Hell of an Engineer" (1972) as Shunji
 Lucky Feller (1976) as Chinese waiter
 Warship (1977) as Foreign Minister Zee Khay Lim
 The Water Margin: (1976–1978) as Narrator (English dub)
 It Ain't Half Hot Mum (1977–1978) as Me Thant
 The Tomorrow People: "The Lost Gods" (1978) as Matsu Tan
 Monkey Magic (1978–1979) as Narrator (English dub)
 Shoestring (1980) as Mr Wing
 Minder (1980) as Sojo
 Tenko (1981) as Major Yamauchi
 Doctor Who: "Four to Doomsday" (1982) as Lin Futu
 Hammer House of Mystery and Suspense: "Mark of the Devil" (1984) as Lee
 Tickle on the Tum (1984) as Willie Wok
 Howards' Way (1987) as Mr Lee
 T-Bag Bounces Back (1987) as Hi Hatt
 Noble House (1988) as Phillip Chen
 The House of Eliott (1991) as Peter Lo Ching
 Lovejoy (1992, "Eric of Arabia") as Banker
 Lovejoy (1993, "The Peking Gun") as Mr Ying
 Space Precinct (1994, "Protect and Survive") as Slik Ostrasky
 Bullet to Beijing (1996) as Kim Soo
 The Harry Hill Show (1997–2000) 
 Queen of Swords: "The Dragon" (2001) as Master Kiyomassa
 Banzai (2001) as Narrator
 Last of the Summer Wine (2002–2010) as Entwistle
 Judge John Deed (2005, "Separation of Powers") as Professor Vang Pao
 Silent Witness (2006, "Cargo") as Jimmy Han
 Honest (2008) as Mr Hong
 Spirit Warriors (2009) as Shen
 Whatever Happened to Harry Hill (2012)

Audio theatre
 Doctor Who: Loups-Garoux (2001) as Doctor Hayashi

Video games
 Fire Warrior (2003) as El'Lusha
 EyeToy: Play (2003) as Announcer

Miscellaneous
 Film trailer –  Monty Python and the Holy Grail (1974) as Asian Voiceover Announcer
 A 17-minute interview with Burt Kwouk from 2010 about his appearances in ITC shows is featured on the Network DVD The Sentimental Agent.

References

External links
 
 Burt Kwouk (Aveleyman)
 Burt Kwouk(Kinotv)
 

1930 births
2016 deaths
Deaths from cancer in England
British male actors of Chinese descent
English male film actors
English male television actors
English male voice actors
English people of Chinese descent
Officers of the Order of the British Empire
Bowdoin College alumni
Male actors from Warrington
Male actors from Shanghai
British male comedy actors